Vazhani Dam is a clay dam built across the Wadakkancherry river near Wadakkancherry in Thrissur district of Kerala. The water is used for irrigation and drinking purposes. The dam has a four-acre garden and the construction was completed in 1962.
Vazhani dam is built with mud and it is an earth dam like Banasura Sagar Dam

Gallery

See also
List of reservoirs and dams in India

References

Dams completed in 1962
Dams in Thrissur district
1962 establishments in Kerala
20th-century architecture in India